Derek Grace (29 December 1944 – 8 January 2019) was an English footballer who played as a forward most notably in the Football League.

Career 
Grace played at the youth level with Queens Park Rangers F.C., but failed to break the first team. In 1962, he played in the Football League Fourth Division with Exeter City F.C. After three seasons with Exeter he played in the Football League Third Division with Gillingham F.C.where he made five appearances. In 1965, he played in the Southern Football League with Margate F.C. where he assisted in securing the Southern League Cup in 1967–68. He later played in the Kent League with Dartford F.C.

In 1970, he played abroad in the National Football League with Berea Park F.C. and had a stint in 1972 with Maidstone United F.C. In 1973, he played in Canada with London City in the National Soccer League. In the fall of 1973 he played with Gravesend & Northfleet, and in 1976 played with Herne Bay F.C.

He died on 8 January 2019 in Cape Town, South Africa.

References 

1944 births
2019 deaths
English footballers
Exeter City F.C. players
Gillingham F.C. players
Margate F.C. players
Dartford F.C. players
Berea Park F.C. players
Maidstone United F.C. (1897) players
London City players
Gravesend United F.C. players
Herne Bay F.C. players
English Football League players
Southern Football League players
National Football League (South Africa) players
Canadian National Soccer League players
People from Chiswick
Footballers from Chiswick
Association football forwards